Regional elections were held in Denmark in March 1913.  10,038 municipal council members were elected.

References

1913
Denmark
Elections
March 1913 events